The eighth season of The Real Housewives of Orange County, an American reality television series, was broadcast on Bravo. It aired from April 1, 2013 until September 1, 2013, and was primarily filmed in Orange County, California. Its executive producers are Adam Karpel, Alex Baskin, Douglas Ross, Gregory Stewart, Scott Dunlop, Stephanie Boyriven and Andy Cohen.

The Real Housewives of Orange County focuses on the lives of Vicki Gunvalson, Tamra Barney, Gretchen Rossi, Alexis Bellino, Heather Dubrow and Lydia McLaughlin. It consisted of 22 episodes.

Production and crew
In September 2012, Alexis Bellino revealed that The Real Housewives of Orange County had been renewed for an eighth season. In February 2013, the official cast, trailer and premiered dare were announced. The season premiere "Bullies and Babies" was aired on April 1, 2013, while the twentieth episode "Cold Shoulders" served as the season finale, and was aired on August 5, 2013. It was followed by a three-part reunion that aired on August 12, August 19 and August 26, 2013 and a "Secrets Revealed" episode on September 1, 2013, which marked the conclusion of the season. Adam Karpel, Alex Baskin, Douglas Ross, Gregory Stewart, Scott Dunlop, Stephanie Boyriven and Andy Cohen are recognized as the series' executive producers; it is produced and distributed by Evolution Media.

The following day after the final episode of season eight, the second spin-off to The Real Housewives of Orange County titled Tamra's OC Wedding premiered on Bravo, starring Barney and Eddie Judge. The series documented the couple as they prepared for their wedding and as well as the wedding day itself. The three-part miniseries chronicles the weeks prior to the couple's wedding as well as the wedding itself — which took place on June 15, 2013, at the Monarch Beach Resort in Dana Point, California. After the wedding and in future seasons, Barney is now known as Tamra Judge.

On July 13, 2016 Bravo aired a "Special Episode" that featured a never before seen look at season eight. All the cast members, full-time and recurring, returned to discuss the events that occurred during the season. After the episode aired, Gretchen Rossi claimed she was unhappy with the way the episode was edited to make her look like a liar. Rossi claimed she would be seeking legal action and might leak the emails she allegedly had from her time on the series.

Cast and synopsis
All fives housewives featured on the seventh season of The Real Housewives of Orange County returned for the eighth instalment. With the five former wives returning, the season also featured a new wife, Lydia McLaughlin. McLaughlin is described as a "fresh-faced, level headed and surprisingly direct OC heiress" as well as a "young, kooky mother always puts her family and faith first." Along with all the housewives returning, former housewife Lauri Peterson returned in a recurring capacity. Peterson returned supporting Tamra Barney with her wedding duties as well as revealing some gossip about Vicki Gunvalson.

Although Alexis Bellino returned for the eighth season, in September 2012, she originally quit after the seventh due to no longer wanting to be around the drama and bullying. Bellino allegedly received a call from the producers asking her to reconsider and after thinking about it, she decided to return to the series. No. I’m going to go back and fight and make my statement."

Barney and Judge take the next step in their relationship when they move in together as they prepare for their upcoming nuptials. Her and the other ladies head to Mexico for her bachelorette party. The bachelorette events prepared by Heather Dubrow and Gretchen Rossi don't go to plan when Vicki Gunvalson steps in and takes control to make things more fun. This marks the beginning of an end of Barney and Rossi newly formed friendship. Barney and Judge mix personal with business as they arrange for the opening of their fitness studio Cut Fitness. Barney opens old wounds when she speaks at the Los Angeles Women's Expo, where details of her past that she has kept secret for years.
Bellino becomes friends with Gunvalson after feeling isolated from several of the housewives. Her isolation with the other wives worsens at a dinner at Barney's gym, where Bellino reveals she has had to go on Xanax due to the "bullying." McLaughlin disagrees with Bellino's choice of words which creates a divide in their friendship and leaves the other wives seeing McLaughlin as her own person and not just Bellino's friend. Away from the drama, Bellino and her husband relish in their marriage with salsa dancing and opening a new trampoline park.
McLaughlin and her husband Doug connect with the Bellinos over their shared devotion to Christianity. McLaughlin and her mom celebrate her newfound sobriety with marijuana, but some wounds from her childhood haven't healed. McLaughlin and her husband run are magazine editors for Beverly Hills Lifestyle Magazine, but not offering Dubrow the cover causes tension between to two wives.
Dubrow re-establishes her presence in the entertainment industry after securing recurring positions in the television series Hot in Cleveland and Malibu Country, however her husband doesn't seem as excited. The Dubrows argue about Terry's lack of excitement and support for Heather which leaves Terry using the word "divorce."
Gunvalson embraces being a grandmother to Briana's newborn son Troy. Gunvalson's relationship with Ayers becomes increasingly turbulent, especially when Gunvalson's son-in-law drops a bomb about Ayers. Gunvalson recently had plastic surgery on her face, but it soon becomes the talk center of gossip. 
Rossi reconsiders marriage and beginning a family after her relationship with Slade becomes more stable due to Slade getting work at a radio station. Later in the season Rossi takes the plunge and proposes to Slade in a big celebration involving a song, helicopters and his family.

 During her segment at the reunion, Peterson sits next to Andy, replacing Rossi. Rossi, Dubrow, and McLaughlin all move down a seat so she can be seated.
 Gunvalson's daughter, Briana, and then-boyfriend Brooks appear at the reunion. Briana is seated next to Andy, opposite her mother, replacing Rossi. Brooks is seated next to Vicki, replacing Barney. Barney and Bellino each move down a seat so he can be seated.

Episodes

References

External links

 
 
 

2013 American television seasons
Orange County (season 8)